Stela Posavec (born 26 August 1996) is a Croatian handballer for RK Lokomotiva Zagreb and the Croatian national team.

She participated at the 2018 European Women's Handball Championship.

She is Paula Posavec's twin sister.

International honours
EHF European Cup:
Winner: 2017
Runner-up: 2021

References

External links

1996 births
Living people
Sportspeople from Čakovec
Croatian female handball players
Twin sportspeople
Croatian twins
Competitors at the 2022 Mediterranean Games
Mediterranean Games silver medalists for Croatia
Mediterranean Games medalists in handball